Luc-Julien-Joseph Casabianca (7 February 1762 – 1 August 1798) was an officer of the French Navy in the 18th century.  He was killed at the Battle of the Nile.

Career 

Casabianca distinguished himself in the Royal French Navy, was a deputy for Corsica at the National Convention, then became member of the Council of Five Hundred. He was the commander of flagship Orient, which transported Napoleon across the Mediterranean during his expedition to Egypt.

During the Battle of the Nile of 1 August 1798, where Rear-Admiral Horatio Nelson destroyed the French fleet in Aboukir Bay, Casabianca fought heroically until his death. During the course of battle, he ordered Giocante, his 10-year-old son who accompanied him, to remain in a section of the ship until he called for him. Although the ship was on fire, the boy, who did not know that his father was no longer alive, refused to leave his post without receiving his orders. After the fire reached the gunpowder section, the ship exploded; the child perished, along with an unknown number of crewmen.

Posterity

Literature 
Felicia Hemans made the death of Giocante Casabianca the subject of her poem "Casabianca", with its line "The boy stood on the burning deck ...", which became a classic of English literature and was studied in elementary school classes.

At least six ships of the French Navy have borne the name Casabianca.

See also 
Levant Fleet
Flotte du Ponant

References

External link
 
 
 

1762 births
1798 deaths
Corsican politicians
People from Haute-Corse
French Navy officers
French Republican military leaders killed in the French Revolutionary Wars